Miguel de la Borda  is a corregimiento in Donoso District, Colón Province, Panama with a population of 2,326 as of 2010. It is the seat of Donoso District. Its population as of 1990 was 2,218; its population as of 2000 was 2,052.

References

Corregimientos of Colón Province
Road-inaccessible communities of Panama